Michael Wilmer Blake (April 6, 1956 – November 29, 2022) was a Canadian ice hockey goaltender who played 40 games in the National Hockey League with the Los Angeles Kings between 1982 and 1984. Blake was born in Kitchener, Ontario.

His uncle Toe Blake was a famous Montreal Canadiens player, playing with Rocket Richard.

Blake was in goal for Wayne Gretzky's record-setting 92nd goal of the season on March 28, 1982.

Blake died on November 29, 2022.

Career statistics

Regular season and playoffs

Awards and honours

References

External links
 

1956 births
2022 deaths
Canadian ice hockey goaltenders
Ice hockey people from Ontario
Los Angeles Kings players
New Haven Nighthawks players
Ohio State Buckeyes men's ice hockey players
Saginaw Gears players
Sportspeople from Kitchener, Ontario
Undrafted National Hockey League players